Sabeena Farooq is a Pakistani theatre and television actress. She is known for portraying Maina in Suno Chanda 2 (2019), Mishal in Log Kia Kahengay (2019) and as Zoya in Kashf (2020).

Career
Sabeena has played the female lead in a number of television productions, including Maa Sadqey (2018), Suno Chanda 2 (2019) and Log Kiya Kahenge (2018). Her other appearances include De Ijazat (2018) and Salaam Zindagi (2018).

Filmography

Film
Janaan (2016)

Television

References

External links

Living people
21st-century Pakistani actresses
Pakistani television actresses
1994 births